Anthony Martin Giffard  Wells (born 1942) was Archdeacon of France from 2002 to 2006.

Wells was educated at the Open University and  St John's College, Nottingham; and ordained deacon in 1974 and priest in 1975. After a curacy in Orpington he was Priest in charge at Odell then Pavenham. He was Rural Dean of Sharnbrook from 1981 to 1986; and Rector of Angmering from 1986 to 1998.  He then served at Paris and Gibraltar.

References

1942 births
Alumni of the Open University
Alumni of St John's College, Nottingham
Archdeacons of France
Living people
20th-century Anglican priests
21st-century Anglican priests
People from Angmering